OnlyFans is an internet content subscription service based in London, United Kingdom. The service is used primarily by sex workers who produce pornography, but it also hosts the work of other content creators, such as physical fitness experts and musicians. 

Content creators can earn money from users who subscribe to their content—the "fans". It allows content creators to receive funding directly from their fans on a monthly basis as well as one-time tips and the pay-per-view (PPV) feature. The website was reported to have 2 million content creators and 130 million users as of August 2021.

The website has been criticized for insufficiently preventing child sexual abuse material from circulating on the platform, though statistical evidence on the severity of the problem is mixed. In August 2021, a campaign to investigate OnlyFans began in the United States Congress, and it was reported that from October 2021 onward OnlyFans would no longer allow sexually explicit material, due to pressure from banks that OnlyFans used for user payments. However, this decision was reversed six days later due to backlash from users and creators alike.

History
OnlyFans is mainly used by pornographic creators, both amateur and professional, but it also has a market with chefs, fitness trainers, and musicians. The company charges a 20% fee for all transactions made on the site. With Teespring, creators can advertise merchandise on the site, which OnlyFans does not take a fee from.

Founding
OnlyFans was launched in November 2016 as a platform for performers to provide clips and photos to followers for a monthly subscription fee. Tim Stokely founded the company alongside his older brother, Thomas, with a £10,000 loan from his father, Guy Stokely, who told him "Tim, this is going to be the last one". His brother became the company's chief operating officer and his father is head of finance for OnlyFans.

Two years later, Ukrainian-American businessman Leonid Radvinsky, owner of MyFreeCams, acquired 75% ownership of Fenix International Limited and became one of its directors. After this, OnlyFans became increasingly focused on not safe for work (NSFW) content and "gained a pop culture reputation for being a hive of pornography".

Growth 
Amateur and professional sex workers were the "key drivers" of OnlyFan's initial growth. The site experienced further growth when rapper Cardi B and actress and singer Bella Thorne joined the platform. A trend on OnlyFans saw creators giving away sexual content in exchange for proof of charity donations, beginning with Kaylen Ward raising US$1 million in contributions to charity during the Australian wild bushfires in Australia in January 2020.

Since 2019, OnlyFans's account verification process has involved a selfie headshot including an ID photo.

The COVID-19 pandemic and subsequent lockdowns had significant impacts on OnlyFans' growth. Prior to this growth, the number of users stood at 7.5million. New user and creator accounts increased by 75 percent from March to April 2020. Genres of content creators included personal trainers, gamers, musicians and fashion influencers.

After the site was mentioned by Beyoncé in the remix of the Megan Thee Stallion song, "Savage", in April 2020, CEO Tim Stokely claimed OnlyFans was "seeing about 200,000 new users every 24 hours and 7,000 to 8,000 new creators joining every day." It was reportedly a 15% spike in traffic after the remix's release. In the same line she also mentioned Demon Time, a social media show. Shortly after the release of that song, OnlyFans announced a partnership with Demon Time to create a monetized virtual nightclub using the site's dual-screen live feature.

Bella Thorne set a new OnlyFans record when she earned over $1 million within 24 hours of joining the platform in August 2020 and more than $2 million in less than a week. She promised nude photos for $200 but instead only provided lingerie-clad photographs, leading to a large number of chargebacks. After this, new restrictions were introduced that limited the amount that other creators on the platform could charge and how quickly they could get paid, though OnlyFans stated the restrictions were unrelated to Thorne but rather part of "an evolving process". Thorne's actions caused backlash among sex workers who felt Thorne had selfishly appropriated their profession.

In late 2020, OnlyFans had 85 million users and more than a million creators. By March 2021, OnlyFans' user base topped 120 million and creators collectively earned $3 billion in revenue. OnlyFans states that it pays out more than $200 million a month to creators. In 2021, they reached a company valuation of $1billion. Their revenue was around $900million for 2021, a rise from $350million in the previous year. Owner Leonid Radvinsky received $500million in dividends in a roughly two-year period from 2021 to 2022.

OnlyFans soft launched OFTV in 2021, an app and streaming site with a collection of its safe for work content. In the same year, professional boxer Floyd Mayweather Jr., DJ Khaled and Fat Joe, and Terrell Owens joined OnlyFans. In 2022, OFTV released Model Farmers, a reality television show hosted by Becky Houze. The show features celebrities working on a farm in the United Kingdom. In 2022, OnlyFans signed deals with the Sims family, who starred in the English reality television show The Only Way is Essex, and Whitney Cummings to star in shows for OFTV, set to release in 2023. Cummings also started an account on OnlyFans' main site.

In March 2021, OnlyFans launched a creative fund to provide £20,000 grants to four emerging musicians in the UK, with Stefflon Don on the selection panel. A second initiative, the following year, was the OFTV program Creative Fund: Fashion Edition, a reality fashion show featuring designer Rebecca Minkoff. It was judged by Law Roach, Sir John, and Maeve Reilly; the winner received $50,000, and $25,000 was awarded to second and third place. A four-part Comedy Edition of the program in the U.K. and Ireland is set to air in 2023, with a similar prize fund. It will be judged by London Hughes, Jamali Maddix and Mae Martin; Jack Guinness will host and Sofie Hagen will appear.

In April 2021, Time named OnlyFans in its Time 100 Most Influential Companies list. Additionally, Fast Company named OnlyFans as one of the 10 most innovative social media companies in 2021.

In April 2021, Bhad Bhabie broke Thorne's OnlyFans record by earning over $1 million in the first 6 hours. This event sparked criticism on social media about her subscribers given that she had turned 18 the previous week.

In December 2021, Tim Stokely announced that he would be stepping down and that Amrapali Gan would be taking over from him.

In May 2022, Carmen Electra joined the site, debuting her account with photos from her 50th birthday. The same year, Pennsylvania congressional candidate Alexandra Hunt joined the platform and announced that her campaign had raised around $100,000 in one month.

As of June 2022, OnlyFans had around 1,000 employees, 80% of whom focus on content moderation and support.

In September 2022, popular Twitch streamer Amouranth stated to Insider that she was earning $1.5 million every month on the site and had grossed more than $33 million in total since joining in early 2020.

Concerns about child sexual abuse material
A BBC Three documentary alleged in 2020 that a third of Twitter profiles globally advertising 'nudes4sale' (or similar) belong to underage individuals, many of whom used OnlyFans to share their content. In May 2021, the BBC reported that OnlyFans was "failing to prevent underage users from selling and appearing in explicit videos" after an investigation. This included reports from UK Police, schools and Childline. However, the National Center for Missing & Exploited Children reported under 100 instances of child sexual abuse material on OnlyFans per year, while MindGeek-owned companies accounted for around 13,000 cases, Twitter accounted for 65,000 and Facebook accounted for 20 million instances.

On 10 August 2021, US Representative Ann Wagner announced a bipartisan coalition pressuring the Department of Justice to investigate OnlyFans for child exploitation, citing increasing reports by law enforcement and child safety organizations that minors are being sold on OnlyFans, as well as instances of sex trafficking and image-based abuse. Over 100 members of Congress signed the petition. The Christian pressure group Exodus Cry and the National Center on Sexual Exploitation, founded as a Catholic organization, were cited as influencers in the campaign against the website.

Later in August 2021, OnlyFans released its first transparency report regarding the company's safety compliance program. OnlyFans said that it uses machine learning classifiers to locate child sexual abuse material (CSAM) and hashes to keep track of CSAM content, passing such information on to the National Center for Missing & Exploited Children (NCMEC). However, in July 2021 it only passed one hash and details of 14 accounts, out of the 15 suspended for CSAM, onto the NCMEC. Gizmodo and The Verge commented on the unclarity of the reports' figures, which are limited to July 2021 and combine requests for data from law enforcement and from charity helplines.

The company gave $500,000 to the Child Rescue Coalition in 2022 for a project intended to investigate adult online behavior that is sexually threatening to children.

2021 planned porn ban 
Shortly following increased campaigning against OnlyFans due to concerns about child sexual abuse material, on 19 August 2021, the company announced that from 1 October 2021 onwards it will not be allowing sexually explicit content. The company pushed the update through a new Terms of Service Policy. The company would still have allowed nudity on some grounds.

The reason for this shift was initially reported as pressure from credit card companies including Mastercard, but CEO Tim Stokely later told Financial Times that it was due to withdrawn support from banks such as BNY Mellon and JPMorgan Chase, and that Mastercard had "no bearing on the decision". Stokely said that BNY Mellon had "flagged and rejected" each transaction from the company and that Metro Bank had withdrawn support abruptly in 2019.

The decision was met with widespread backlash by creators and consumers of OnlyFans. Six days after the initial announcement, OnlyFans said that it would be reversing the decision and that adult content would be allowed on the site indefinitely, citing that they had "secured assurances necessary" to do so.

The website Fansly surged in popularity as an alternative to OnlyFans for sex workers after the retracted ban announcement. Originally beginning operations in November 2020, Fansly's website design and functionality has been regarded by MEL Magazine as "nearly identical" to OnlyFans.

Sanctions during the 2022 Russian invasion of Ukraine 
Content creators from Russia and Belarus reported that they were not able to withdraw their funds or were excluded from the platform as part of the economic sanctions following the 2022 Russian invasion of Ukraine. OnlyFans said that this was because "worldwide financial restrictions" led them to have "very limited methods to pay Creator accounts linked to Russia and Belarus". OnlyFans later said that they had restored full functionality to these accounts. On 21 April 2022, OnlyFans "temporarily paused" Russian creators' accounts.

Criticism
In February 2020, BuzzFeed News reported that up to 4 terabytes of hacked OnlyFans content went viral on social media. It is supposed to come from hundreds of different accounts and was spread on Mega cloud storage and Google Drive.  Daly Barnett, a technologist from the Electronic Frontier Foundation, told BuzzFeed News that "These platforms routinely have terrible security posture and reprehensible incident response". OnlyFans denied that any breach had occurred.

In July 2020, Sky News reported that OnlyFans had not paid value-added tax the previous three years and could face heavy penalties from tax authorities.

In August 2020, Forensic News reported that the company was facing multiple allegations of fraud and theft after content creators and users said they had money stolen from their accounts. Radvinsky's previous business ventures were flagged by banks for indicators of money laundering.

In August 2022, it was reported that a series of lawsuits were filed which allege that OnlyFans had bribed employees of Meta to add Instagram accounts whose users sold content on OnlyFans' competitor websites to a terrorist blacklist. The lawsuits allege that adult performers including Alana Evans had traffic driven away from their Instagram accounts after being falsely tagged as terror-related, effectively shadow banning them and diminishing their ability to promote their content on rival websites. In response to the lawsuits, OnlyFans said that "We are not aware of any evidence which supports these allegations."

Demographics 
Research from the Archives of Sexual Behaviour found that the typical user of OnlyFans is white (68.9%), married (89.5%), male (63.1%) and heterosexual (59%). The study found that the sexual attitudes of OnlyFans users were not significantly different from the general population.

See also 

 Chatroulette
 Pornhub 
 Patreon

References

External links 
 

2016 establishments in England
British companies established in 2016
British erotica and pornography websites
Companies based in London
Social media companies
Video hosting